Sandre Naumoski (born 3 July 1979 in Skopje, SR Macedonia, present day Macedonia) is a Macedonian American indoor soccer player. He currently plays in the MISL.  He stands 5' 8" at 160 lbs.  Naumoski is noted for playing midfield with the Philadelphia Kixx of the MISL II.  He had stayed with the KiXX for the current 2007–2008 MISL II season with fellow Macedonian Dino Delevski, who was traded to the Monterrey La Raza early in the season.

References

American people of Macedonian descent
North Macedonia emigrants to the United States
1979 births
Living people
Monterrey La Raza players
Sportspeople from Skopje